The 20th Moscow International Film Festival was held from 19 to 29 July 1997. The Golden St. George was awarded to the American film Marvin's Room directed by Jerry Zaks.

Jury
 Oleg Menshikov (Russia – President of the Jury)
 Georgi Djulgerov (Bulgaria)
 Irakli Kvirikadze (Georgia)
 Fernando Mendez-Leite (Spain)
 Michel Seydoux (France)
 Sergio Olhovich (Mexico)
 Mrinal Sen (India)
 Beata Tyszkiewicz (Poland)

Films in competition
The following films were selected for the main competition:

Awards
 Golden St. George: Marvin's Room by Jerry Zaks
 Special Silver St. George: Mother and Son by Alexander Sokurov
 Silver St. George:
 Best Director: János Szász for The Witman Boys
 Best Actor: Til Schweiger for Knockin' on Heaven's Door
 Best Actress: Isabel Ordaz for Chevrolet
 Prix FIPRESCI: The Witman Boys by János Szász
 Honorable Prize - For the contribution to the cinema:
 Robert De Niro, actor (United States)
 Andrei Mikhalkov-Konchalovsky, director (Russia)
 Sophia Loren, actress (Italy)
 Catherine Deneuve, actress (France)

References

External links
Moscow International Film Festival: 1997 at Internet Movie Database

1997
1997 film festivals
Moscow
June 1997 events in Russia
1997 in Moscow
Moscow